John Arthur Baycroft (born 2 June 1934) was a Canadian Anglican bishop in the second half of the 20th century.

Baycroft was born in Redcar, was educated at  Sir William Turner School, Redcar and  Christ's College, Cambridge and ordained in 1956. He held incumbencies in  Loughborough, Ontario, Ottawa and Perth, Ontario before becoming Dean of Ottawa in 1984. From 1986 to 1992, he was suffragan bishop of Ottawa and then its diocesan until 1999.

References

 

1934 births
People from Redcar
Canadian people of English descent
People educated at Sir William Turner's Grammar School, Redcar
Alumni of Christ's College, Cambridge
Anglican bishops of Ottawa
20th-century Anglican Church of Canada bishops
Living people
Deans of Ottawa